Susan Aaron-Taylor is an American artist who creates mixed-media sculptures.  For forty years she was a professor at the Crafts Department of the College for Creative Studies, Detroit, Michigan. Her work is abstract and surreal that stems from alchemy, focusing on story-telling with dream-like qualities.

Biography 
Susan Aaron-Taylor was born 1947 in Brooklyn, New York. She lives and creates art works in Pleasant Ridge, Michigan.

Career 
Aaron-Taylor earned a Bachelor of Science at Wayne State University and a Master of Fine Arts at Cranbrook Academy of Art. She served as the Section Chairperson of the Fiber Design Department. and Professor of the Crafts Department at the College for Creative Studies for over 40 years in Detroit, Michigan. When she retired, Aaron-Taylor was granted emeritus status.

Aaron-Taylor is known for her artworks that draw inspiration from her knowledge of alchemy, story-telling, chemistry, Jungian psychology, philosophy, archetypes, and the Collective Unconscious. She has exhibited  for over thirty years and her work has been included in permanent as well as private collections.

Style and technique 
Aaron-Taylor has created a body of artwork that consists of modest-sized sculptural objects which depict fantasy-like figures recalled from her dreams, including dogs, cats and other small creatures. The distortions from the anatomical correctness of the objects results from a practice of using tree roots, affixing felt in multiple colors for the basis of the core figure's form. She hand-processes her own felt. which she uses emulate an animal's pelt. She incorporates other natural and man-made materials, such as gemstones, pieces of metal, teeth and bone. She  uses meditation and Jungian imagery as a source for inspirations.

One of Aaron-Taylor's most prominent work was in the Dreamscapes and Soul Shards series which focuses on the psychology of marriage, dreams, and turning the ordinary into the extraordinary. The Soul Shards series focuses on the retrieval of these broken pieces of soul.

Before creating a series and gathering her materials, Aaron-Taylor will research her pieces to build upon her ideas to enhance the story-telling process. She believes that the process of making a piece is journey and as a long-time student of the Jungian psychology, most of her work comes from dreams that are a direct response from her interest in The Tarot, shamanism, ritual, alchemy, archetypes, and the collective unconscious. She brings forth parts from her dreams that bring poignancy, humor, and meaning.

Significant works 
  Deity series
  Dreamscape series
 Dream Games series
  Threshold series
  Soul Shard series
  Teapot Series
 Journeying Series
Each series stems from an important aspect of Aaron-Taylor's life whether it was from childhood or dreams, they deal with fascination and narrative story-telling.

Shows and collections 
 Selected one-person exhibitions
Soul Shard #30, 2006; Wayne State University Art Permanent Collection, Detroit, MI
Deity VIII, 1990; Cranbrook Art Museum Permanent Collection No. CAM 1992.17, Cranbrook Academy of Art, Bloomfield Hills, MI.
 Renaissance Center, Commissioned Wall Relief - Westin Hotels, Detroit, MI
 K-Mart Corporation, Permanent Collection, Troy, MI

Reviews and essays
  Dennis Alan Nawrocki; Steve Panton; Matthew Piper. "Essay'd 3: 30 Detroit artists". Wayne State University Press (2018). .
  Green, Roger. "Personal Paths In her mixed-media sculptures, Susan Aaron-Taylor re-creates the landscape of her dreams, informed by Carl Jung's spiritually charged concepts." American Craft Council 70, no. 6  (2010):30. ISSN 0194-8008.
 Carl Kamulski; Sisson Gallery. "2010 Motor City Revue: 38 Detroit artists". Henry Ford Community College (2010). OCLC no.: 608538323.

References

Further reading 
  Nevin, Dorica (April 2008). “Interview with Artist & Teacher: Susan Aaron-Taylor.”  Psyche’s Journey Volume I, pp. 4–7.

External links 
Susan Aaron-Taylor website
Susan Aaron-Taylor University Art Collection 
Form and Concept
NCRC Gallery, Ann Arbor

20th-century American sculptors
21st-century American sculptors
Cranbrook Academy of Art alumni
1947 births
Living people
American women sculptors
Artists from Brooklyn
Sculptors from Michigan
People from Pleasant Ridge, Michigan
Cranbrook Academy of Art faculty
Wayne State University alumni
21st-century American women artists
20th-century American women artists
Sculptors from New York (state)
American women academics